Nikolai Petrovich Fadeyev (born 9 May 1993) is a Russian professional football player.

Club career
He played for FC Spartak Moscow in the 2012–13 Russian Cup game against FC Salyut Belgorod on 26 September 2012.

He made his Russian Premier League debut for FC Amkar Perm on 30 August 2013 in a game against PFC CSKA Moscow.

References

External links
 
 
 
 Player page by sportbox.ru  
 

1993 births
Sportspeople from Ulyanovsk
Living people
Russian footballers
Russia youth international footballers
Association football defenders
FC Spartak Moscow players
FC Amkar Perm players
Russian Premier League players
FC Khimki players
FC Torpedo Moscow players
FC SKA-Khabarovsk players
FC Spartak-2 Moscow players